Anna Cecilia Petra Östergren (born 29 September 1965 in Kiruna Municipality) is a Swedish feminist writer, debater, social commentator and an instructor in self-defense. She has an MA in Social Anthropology (Stockholm University), and is a doctoral student at Lund University. Her research is titled "The State of Feminism".

Self-defence 
In the 1980s Östergren helped launch a feminist self-defense movement in Sweden. She was active as an instructor in the organisation Pandora kvinnligt försvar (Pandora Women's Defense) and ran the Kung Fu club in the kajukenbo style in an effort to help women defend themselves against sexual assault. She was involved with the Swedish Women's shelters organization Roks.
She is the author of Slå tillbaka!: Handbok i självförsvar (Fight back!; A handbook of self-defence) published in 1993. She also wrote a book about her mother, who was beaten to death by a man she had had a brief relationship with, entitled Att komma till ro med det allra värsta (Coming to terms with the worst).

Sociology and gender politics 
Her involvement with teaching men self-defence made her a controversial figure with radical feminists, and the rift became complete when she published an article in Bang magazine in which she questioned whether all pornography was essentially misogynous.

Östergren is considered a major critic of radical feminism in Sweden. In particular she has challenged their views on sex, violence and power, pointing out that violence in lesbian relationships did not differ significantly from that in heterosexual relationships. From its origin, Östergren was one of the few people who publicly challenged the radical feminist position on prostitution which culminated in the sexköpslagen (Sex Purchase Act) 1999. She has been an advocate for the decriminalisation of prostitution. In 2006, she published Porr, horor och feminister (Porn, whores and feminists), an analysis of three decades of Swedish policy on pornography and prostitution, and a critique of radical feminist sexual politics. In 2008, she published an edited volume F-ordet – Mot en ny feminism (The F-word – Towards a new feminism), bringing together writers and commentators to provide new perspectives on old feminist issues.

Work 
In addition to her books, Östergren writes regularly for newspapers and magazines, including Svenska Dagbladet, LO-tidningen, Expressen, Aftonbladet, Axess magasin and Voltaire and regularly gives public talks, and is consulted on prostitution and gender issues.

Bibliography

Books 
  Slå tillbaka!: handbok i självförsvar för kvinnor. Natur & Kultur, 1993. Revised 1998
  Att komma till ro med det allra värsta]. Natur & Kultur, 1996
  Porr, horor och feminister. Natur & Kultur, 2006
Review
 Tiden har kommit ikapp Petra Östergren. Fria Tidningen, 20 November 2006
 F-ordet – Mot en ny feminism. Alfabeta bokförlag, 2008
 Berättelsen om Esmara (The Story of Esmara). Piratförlaget, 2010
Reviews
 Berättelsen om Esmara; Skönlitteratur behöver rymd mellan orden Svenska Dagbladet Kultur, 15 September 2010
 Petra Östergren vet hur fasan känns. Norrländska Socialdemokraten, 11 September 2010, archived 2012

Articles 
 Brave new man. Axess magasin, February 2010
 The Swedish Sex Purchase Act: Claimed Success and Documented Effects. S Dodillet, P Östergren. May 2011

Research 
 Synden ideologiserad. Modern svensk prostitutionspolicy som identitets- och trygghetsskapare. MA Thesis, Dept. Anthropology, Stockholm University 2003

See also 
Prostitution in Sweden

References

External links 
 Petra Östergren's website

1965 births
Living people
People from Kiruna Municipality
Swedish female martial artists
Writers from Lapland (Sweden)
Swedish feminists
Prostitution
Stockholm University alumni
21st-century Swedish women writers
20th-century Swedish women writers
20th-century Swedish writers
21st-century Swedish writers
21st-century Swedish women
20th-century Swedish women